The Honda N-Van (stylized as "Honda N-VAN") is a microvan produced by Honda for the Japanese market. The origin for the vehicle's name expresses "next generation light van" proposed by N series as see in the N-One, N-Box, and N-WGN: it is part of a renewed lineup of Kei class city cars. The use of the letter "N" in the name was used by Honda for the late 1960s and 1970s Honda N360.

Overview 
It was developed with the aim of "a new appearance" of light commercial vehicles in the fifth series of "N series" deployed starting with the first N-BOX released in November 2011. In addition to being the first commercial vehicle in the series, it is also a substantial successor to Acty van, Vamos, & Vamos Hobio which were previously sold.

From the semi-cab overstyle Acty line, it adopts a tall wagon style based on the FF car platform developed at the second generation N-BOX. As a result, the length of the luggage compartment has been greatly reduced by comparison with Acty which had adopted the mid-ship engine layout (the luggage compartment length is 1,510 mm on the left side and 1,330 mm on the right side, shortening by 215–395 mm respectively). On the other hand, for the first time as a microvan, we adopted a "door-in-pillar structure" that eliminated the center pillar on the side of the passenger's side to improve usability in loading and unloading operations of long objects, etc. In addition, similar to the N-Box center tank layout By adopting a low floor by adoption, the cargo compartment height was expanded to 1,365 mm which was 165 mm higher than Acty van. In addition to the rear seat, a dive down mechanism is also adopted for passenger's seat, realizing a luggage room connected from the front passenger's seat to the rear seat/tailgate. It is also possible to load long objects.

The engine variants come from Honda's S-series and are optimised for the load imposed on the commercial vehicle and how it is used. It is available in naturally-aspirated and turbocharged versions. In the naturally-aspirated version it makes 43 kW (48 HP) and 65 Nm of torque, The turbocharged engine is only available on the N-Box RS  which makes peak 47 kW (63 HP) and 104 Nm and is the only version available with AWD. Standard versions of the N-Box get a CVT transmission while the RS gets a 6-speed manual. The vehicle equipped with naturally-aspirated engine and is a 6-speed manual, improved and based on S660.

For safety performance, the driving support system "Honda SENSING" was standard equipped in all types. The collision mitigation brake (CMBS), the pedestrian accident reduction steering, the preceding vehicle departure notification function, the sign recognition function, the out-of-road departure suppression function are provided for all types, and only the "continuously variable transmission automatic" (CVT) Function, adaptive cruise control, lane keeping support system, backward erroneous departure suppression function are added. Also, auto high beams are added to all types of "N-VAN + STYLE".

Battery electric variant 
The battery electric variant of the N-Van will go on sale in Japan in spring 2024.

See also 
 Honda N-One
 Honda N-Box
 Honda N-WGN
 Honda S660

References 

N-Van
Microvans
Cars introduced in 2018
2020s cars